Oscar Joseph "Chick" Levis (August 7, 1898 - May 24, 1983), born Oscar Joseph Levy, was a Jamaican baseball pitcher in the Negro leagues. He played from 1921 to 1931 with the Cuban Stars (East) and the Hilldale Club.

References

External links
 and Baseball-Reference Black Baseball stats and Seamheads

1898 births
1983 deaths
Major League Baseball players from Jamaica
Jamaican expatriate sportspeople in the United States
Jamaican expatriates in Cuba
Expatriate baseball players in Cuba
Almendares (baseball) players
Philadelphia Hilldale Giants players